The UIT rail, also known as Anschutz rail, is a standard used for mounting slings and other gun accessories in competition shooting, and is essentially a T-slot track shaped aluminium extrusion profile accepting attachments in the form of T-slot nuts, or similar.

A similar design is called Freeland rail, but the dimensions of Anschütz (UIT) and Freeland rails differ. The Anschütz rail is wide and shallow, and the Freeland is  narrower and deeper. Accessories made for one of the two types are not necessarily compatible with the other.

Dimensions 
Dimensions below are approximate.

See also 
 Rail Integration System, generic term for a system for attaching accessories to small firearms
 Weaver rail mount, early system used for scope mounts, still has some popularity in the civilian market
 Sling swivel, older standard used for mounting slings, particularly on hunting firearms
 Picatinny rail (MIL-STD-1913), improved and standardized version of the Weaver mount. Used for both for scope mounts, and for accessories (such as extra sling mounts, vertical grips, bipods etc.) Major popularity in the civilian market.
 NATO Accessory Rail- further development from the MIL-STD-1913
 KeyMod - open standard design to replace MIL-STD-1913 for mounting accessories (except for scope mounts)
 M-LOK - free licensed competing standard to KeyMod
 Zeiss rail, a ringless scope mounting standard

References 

Mechanical standards
Firearm components